Gornji Križ is a small settlement in the Municipality of Žužemberk in southeastern Slovenia. The municipality is included in the Southeast Slovenia Statistical Region. The entire area is part of the historical region of Lower Carniola.

References

External links
Gornji Križ at Geopedia

Populated places in the Municipality of Žužemberk